Samuel Dexter (17261810) was an early American politician from Dedham, Massachusetts.

Personal life
Born in 1726 in Dedham, he did not wish to follow his father, also named Samuel Dexter, into the ministry at First Church and Parish in Dedham. He married Hannah Sigourney in 1748. His son, the third Samuel Dexter, served in the administrations of John Adams and Thomas Jefferson.

Career
Dexter moved from Dedham to Boston and earned "a modest fortune" with his "mercantile pursuits." He retired back to Dedham in 1761 at the age of 36 to build the Samuel Dexter House. The house still stands today at 699 High Street.

Political career
After retiring to Dedham, he was active in the community for the next 13 years. He was active politically during the Revolutionary War and kept a diary of his thoughts about the day's events. During this time he served in the Massachusetts Provincial Congress. He served in the Massachusetts House of Representatives from 1764 to 1767 and again in 1765, and 1785. From 1768 to 1774, he was a Governor's Councillor. He was a selectman for five terms beginning in 1764, moderator, justice of the peace, and town clerk in 1761. He was town clerk for a total of five years.

Following the evacuation of Boston, General George Washington spent the night of April 4, 1776 at Dexter's home on his way to New York.  In December 1771, Dexter hosted John Hancock and Jason Haven, his minister and brother-in-law, for dinner. In July 1771, he invited Governor Thomas Hutchinson and several members of the Council to dinner.

On the morning of April 19, 1775, a messenger came "down the Needham road" with news about the battle in Lexington. He stopped at the home of Samuel Dexter and ran up to the front door. Dexter met him at the front door and, upon hearing the news, nearly fainted. He had to be helped back into his house.

Dexter believed that it was suicidal for a group of militiamen to face off against the British Army. Instead, he favored having them retreat to the interior to train before facing off against the redcoats. He was accused of not being sufficiently devoted to the patriot cause but was too proud to fight back.

He resigned all his positions in the autumn of 1775 in ill health and moved to Woodstock, Connecticut. In his will he left $170 to the Dedham Public Schools.

Notes

References

Works cited

1726 births
1810 deaths
People from Woodstock, Connecticut
People of colonial Connecticut
People from colonial Dedham, Massachusetts
Members of the Massachusetts House of Representatives
Members of the colonial Massachusetts Governor's Council
Dedham, Massachusetts selectmen
Dedham Town Clerks